Douglas Evans (January 26, 1904 – March 25, 1968) was an American actor, known for At War with the Army (1950), King of the Rocket Men (1949), and I Saw What You Did (1965).

Biography
Evans was born in Madison, Virginia. In 1931, he joined the staff of WABC radio in New York as an announcer. Before that, he was an announcer at WMCA, also in New York, and was chief announcer at WGH in Virginia.

He died on March 25, 1968, in Hollywood, California. He is interred in Hollywood Forever Cemetery.

Selected filmography

 Public Cowboy No. 1 (1937) - Radio Announcer (uncredited)
 Young Fugitives (1938) - Announcer (uncredited)
 Dick Tracy Returns (1938) - Mr. Burke (uncredited)
 Hold That Co-ed (1938) - Announcer of State-Louisiana Game (uncredited)
 Society Smugglers (1939) - Radio Announcer (uncredited)
 They Asked for It (1939) - Radio Announcer (uncredited)
 Mr. Smith Goes To Washington (1939) - Francis Scott Key (uncredited)
 Sued for Libel (1939) - Douglas Evans, Radio Announcer (uncredited)
 The Green Hornet (1940, Serial) - Martin Mortinson [Chs. 2-3] (uncredited)
 Three Faces West (1940) - 'We the People' Radio MC (uncredited)
 Oklahoma Renegades (1940) - Show Announcer (uncredited)
 King of the Royal Mounted (1940, Serial) - Sergeant - Wireless Operator [Chs. 1, 11] (uncredited)
 Play Girl (1941) - Concert Radio Announcer (uncredited)
 Man Made Monster (1941) - Police Radio Announcer (uncredited)
 Too Many Blondes (1941) - UBC Radio Network Announcer (uncredited)
 Highway West (1941) - Police Announcer (uncredited)
 Parachute Battalion (1941) - Radio Announcer (voice)
 Sailors on Leave (1941) - Radio Announcer (uncredited)
 Dick Tracy vs Crime Inc (1941, Serial) - Police Broadcaster (uncredited)
 The Affairs of Jimmy Valentine (1942) - Radio Announcer
 Seven Days' Leave (1942) - Radio Announcer (uncredited)
 Hitler's Children (1943) - Radio Announcer (voice, uncredited)
 My Dog Shep (1946) - Dutch Riley
 The Farmer's Daughter (1947) - Silbey, Politician (uncredited)
 Dangerous Venture (1947) - Dr. Atwood
 The Crimson Key (1947) - Dr. Kenneth G. Swann
 Flashing Guns (1947) - Longdon
 Dragnet (1947) - Radio Announcer
 The Spirit of West Point (1947) - Corbett (uncredited)
 Gun Talk (1947) - Rod Jackson
 The Main Street Kid (1948) - Mark Howell
 California Firebrand (1948) - Lance Dawson
 Crossed Trails (1948) - Jim Hudson
 Ruthless (1948) - George (uncredited)
 Secret Service Investigator (1948) - Secret Service Inspector Crehan
 Cowboy Cavalier (1948) - Lance Regan
 Michael O'Halloran (1948) - Dr. Johnson
 The Three Musketeers (1948) - British Officer (uncredited)
 Million Dollar Weekend (1948) - Hotel Desk Clerk (uncredited)
 Hideout (1949) - Radio Announcer
 Trails End (1949) - Mel Porter
 King of the Rocket Men (1949, Serial) - Chairman [Ch. 12]
 Neptune's Daughter (1949) - Radio Contest Announcer (voice, uncredited)
 The Golden Stallion (1949) - Jeff Middleton, Owner of Oro City Hotel
 Powder River Rustlers (1949) - Devereaux, posing as Manning
 D.O.A. (1949) - Eddie - Salesman on Phone (uncredited)
 The Arizona Cowboy (1950) - Rodeo Announcer
 Kill the Umpire (1950) - Doctor (uncredited)
 No Sad Songs for Me (1950) - Jack Miles (uncredited)
 The Invisible Monster (1950, Serial) - James Hunter [Chs. 1, 3, 7, 12] (uncredited)
 Champagne for Caesar (1950) - Radio Announcer (uncredited)
 Lucky Losers (1950) - Tom Whitney
 The Underworld Story (1950) - Newscaster (uncredited)
 Between Midnight and Dawn (1950) - Detective Captain (uncredited)
 Rustlers on Horseback (1950) - Lawyer Ken Jordan
 North of the Great Divide (1950) - Mountie Sergeant
 Counterspy Meets Scotland Yard (1950) - Colonel Kilgore
 At War with the Army (1950) - Col. Davis
 Cuban Fireball (1951) - Atkins (uncredited)
 The Groom Wore Spurs (1951) - Reporter (uncredited)
 I Was a Communist for the FBI (1951) - Chief Agent (uncredited)
 Hollywood Story (1951) - Director (uncredited)
 Queen for a Day (1951) - Freddy Forster
 Let's Go Navy! (1951) - Lt. Smith (Personnel Dept.)
 Little Egypt (1951) - Board Member (uncredited)
 Force of Arms (1951) - Colonel Traill (uncredited)
 The Well (1951) - Lobel
 Leave It to the Marines (1951) - Gen. Garvin
 The Whip Hand (1951) - Carstairs (uncredited)
 Sky High (1951) - Maj. Talbot
 Retreat, Hell! (1952) - Big Boy (uncredited)
 With a Song in My Heart (1952) - Colonel (uncredited)
 My Son John (1952) - Government Employee (uncredited)
 Red Ball Express (1952) - Brigadier General at Briefing (uncredited)
 Actor's and Sin (1952) - Mr. Devlin (segment "Woman of Sin")
 The Quiet Man (1952) - Ring Physician (uncredited)
 Just for You (1952) - Raymond
 Captive Women (1952) - Jason
 South Pacific Trail (1952) - Rodney Brewster
 The Magnetic Monster (1953) - Pilot
 The Girls of Pleasure Island (1953) - Lieutenant Commander (uncredited)
 Let's Do It Again (1953) - Black Cat Club Manager (scenes deleted)
 City of Bad Men (1953) - William Brady (uncredited)
 The Big Heat (1953) - Councilman Gillen (uncredited)
 So Big (1953) - Richard 'Dick' Hollis (uncredited)
 The Eddie Cantor Story (1953) - Leo Raymond
 Johnny Dark (1954) - Wellington (uncredited)
 The Benny Goodman Story (1956) - Kel Murray - Orchestra Leader (uncredited)
 The Birds and the Bees (1956) - Guest
 D-Day the Sixth of June (1956) - Ship Captain (uncredited)
 The Toy Tiger (1956) - Executive (uncredited)
 Bundle of Joy (1956) - Doctor (uncredited)
 Beginning of the End (1957) - Norman Taggart - News Editor
 Short Cut to Hell (1957) - Mr. Henry (uncredited)
 The Female Animal (1958) - Al The Director
 The Buccaneer (1958) - Soldier (uncredited)
 The Man in the Net (1959) - Charlie Raines (uncredited)
 Beloved Infidel (1959) - Harry (uncredited)
 From The Terrace (1960) - Partner (uncredited)
 The Errand Boy (1961) - Serina's Escort at Premiere (uncredited)
 Moon Pilot (1962) - Colonel (uncredited)
 I Saw What You Did (1965) - Tom Ward
 Mirage (1965) - Customer (uncredited)
 The Family Jewels (1965) - (uncredited)
 The Oscar (1966) - Reporter (uncredited)
 Panic in the City (1968) - Mayor (final film role)

References

External links

 
 

1904 births
1968 deaths
American male film actors
People from Madison, Virginia
20th-century American male actors